Wait for the Night is an EP released in 1983 by the heavy metal band Virgin Steele promoting the album Guardians of the Flame. This EP was released in Europe by Music for Nations with a different cover, a different track listing and the name A Cry in the Night. It is the last release of the band with guitarist Jack Starr.

A compilation of songs from the EP and from Guardians of the Flame was published in Canada by Maze Music with the title Burn the Sun, in 1984.
 
The three original songs plus the interview from the European version were included as bonus material in the Guardians of the Flame CD remaster in 2002.

Track listing

Personnel

Band members
David DeFeis - all vocals, keyboards, producer
Jack Starr - guitars
Joe O'Reilly - bass
Joey Ayvazian - drums

References

Virgin Steele albums
1983 EPs